Empty The Bones Of You is an album by IDM musician Chris Clark. It was released September 9, 2003, by Warp Records. Thematically, it is a darker album than 2001's Clarence Park. The cover art was designed by The Designers Republic.

Track listing

2003 albums
Clark (musician) albums
Warp (record label) albums